Isalaux is a trilobite in the order Phacopida (family Pterygometopidae), that existed during the upper Ordovician in what is now the United States. It was described by Frederickson and Pollack in 1952, and the type species is Isalaux canonensis. The type locality was the Harding Formation in Colorado.

References

External links 
 Isalaux at the Paleobiology Database

Pterygometopidae
Fossil taxa described in 1952
Ordovician trilobites
Fossils of the United States
Phacopida genera